Ole Martin Lekven Kolskogen (born 20 March 2001) is a Norwegian footballer who plays as a defender for Aalesund.

Career
Kolskogen has previously played for Os Turn in lower divisions. While playing for Os Turn he got his first international matches for Norway U16. 

He signed for Åsane in 2018, He made his debut in the Norwegian First Division while playing with his nickname "Olis" on his jersey-back. Åsane was relegated to the 2nd division, but was promoted to the Norwegian First Division after the 2019 season, partly due to solid defensive play from Kolskogen. During his time in Åsane he got several international matches for Norway U18 and U19, and was called up to U21.

He signed for SK Brann in late 2019.

References

External links

2001 births
Living people
Association football defenders
Norwegian footballers
SK Brann players
Åsane Fotball players
FK Jerv players
Eliteserien players
Norwegian Second Division players
Norway youth international footballers
People from Os, Hordaland
Sportspeople from Vestland